The Nuclear Power Corporation of India Limited (NPCIL) is an Indian public sector undertaking based in Mumbai, Maharashtra. It is wholly owned by the Government of India and is responsible for the generation of electricity from nuclear power. NPCIL is administered by the Department of Atomic Energy (DAE).

NPCIL was created in September 1987 under the Companies Act 1956, "with the objective of undertaking the design, construction, operation and maintenance of the atomic power stations for generation of electricity in pursuance of the schemes and programmes of the Government of India under the provision of the Atomic Energy Act 1962." All nuclear power plants operated by the company are certified for ISO-14001 (Environment Management System).

NPCIL was the sole body responsible for constructing and operating India's commercial nuclear power plants until setting up of BHAVINI Vidyut Nigam in October 2003. As of 10 August 2012 the company had 21 nuclear reactors in operation at seven locations, a total installed capacity of 6780 MWe. Subsequent to the government's decision to allow private companies to provide nuclear power, the company has experienced problems with private enterprises "poaching" its employees.

Nuclear plants

Operational

 Inactive/Shutdown

Under construction

Proposed

See also
 Advanced heavy-water reactor
 BHAVINI
 Bhabha Atomic Research Centre
 IPHWR
 Nuclear power in India

References

External links
NPCIL webpage
NPCIL Jobs

Companies based in Mumbai
Nuclear power companies of India
Government-owned companies of India
Energy companies established in 1987
Indian companies established in 1987
1987 establishments in Maharashtra